Benedicta Ward  (born Florence Margaret Ward, 4 February 1933 – 23 May 2022) was a Church of England nun, theologian and historian. She was a member of the Anglican religious order, the Community of the Sisters of the Love of God and reader in early Christian spirituality at Harris Manchester College, University of Oxford. She was particularly known for her research on the Desert Fathers, popularising the collection of their writings known as the Apophthegmata Patrum. She wrote extensively on Anselm of Canterbury and Bede.

Life 
Florence Margaret Ward was born in Durham to Methodist parents; her father had left the Church of England to marry his Methodist wife and had become a minister in his new denomination.

She came to high church Anglicanism through the beauty of choral evensong. At the age of 22 she entered the Community of the Sisters of the Love of God, an enclosed community of Anglican contemplative nuns at Fairacres in East Oxford, as Sister Benedicta of Jesus.

Works 

Ward wrote a number of books and articles, including translations of premodern texts. She was also a regular public speaker, including on the BBC series A History of the World in 100 Objects. A festschrift was published in her honour in 2014.

Books 

 
 
 
 
 
 
  [Revised version of her thesis: ]

Articles

References 

1933 births
2022 deaths
20th-century British Anglican nuns
20th-century translators
20th-century British women writers
20th-century British non-fiction writers
21st-century British Anglican nuns
British Anglican theologians
Converts to Anglicanism from Methodism
Women religious writers
People from Durham, England